Pavananagar is a village near Pavana Dam in Maharashtra, India. It is about 45 km via Paud and 65 km via Kamshet from Pune. There are roads to Pavananagar from Pune & Lonavala. Lonavala to Pavana Dam is 20 km; 40 minutes journey from Lonavala.
Lonavala → Bhangarwadi → Kusgaon → Aundhgaon → Dudhivarekhind → Prati Pandharpur → Pavana Dam
Pune → Pirangut → Paud → Kolvan → Pavana Dam → Pavananagar.
Pune → Nigdi → Kamshet → Bedsa → Pavananagar.

Pavana Dam
Pavana Dam is constructed across the Pavana River. The construction began in the year 1962 and was completed in 1973. The backwaters of this dam provide a wonderful view. The way from Lonavala to Pavana Dam is 20 km; 40 minutes journey from Lonavala.
Lonavala → Bhangarwadi → Kusgaon → Aundh Gaon → Dudhivarekhind → Prati Pandharpur → Pavana Dam

Way from Pune, 
Pune - Pavananagar via Paud is beautiful during monsoon. The Tikona fort is close to this dam. Seven Kilometers from this dam is Mantra Mandir at Prati-Pandharpur. Aamby Valley City is also close to this dam.

Forts Near Pavana Nagar 
 Tikona– 4 
 Tung – 22 km
 Lohagad – 16 km
 Visapur – 17 km
 Morgiri – 21 km
 Rajmachi – 38 km

Dams Near Pavana Nagar 
 Pavana Dam - 4 Km
 Malavandi – 5 km
 Hadshi – 7 km
 Mulshi – 34 km
 Bhushi – 24 km
 Valvan – 22 km

Caves Near Pavana Nagar 
 Karla – 30 km
 Bhaje – 30 km
 Bedse – 10 km
 Tikona – 5 km

Location
State: Maharashtra
Tal [Maval]
District: Pune

Nearest Town: Pune / Pimpri-Chinchwad / Lonavala

Distance from Pune: Around 45 km (via Paud), Around 65 km (via Kamshet)

Distance from Mumbai: Around 108km (via Mumbai-Pune Expressway), Around 109 km (via National Highway 48)

References 

Villages in Pune district